Akhilesh Singh may refer to:
Akhilesh Kumar Singh (1959–2019), Indian politician, Uttar Pradesh Legislative Assembly member from 1993 to 2017 
Akhilesh Prasad Singh (born 1962), Indian politician, member of the Lok Sabha from 2004 to 2009, member of the Rajya Sabha since 2018
Akhilesh Pratap Singh, Indian politician, Uttar Pradesh Legislative Assembly member from 2012 to 2017